Mologino may refer to:
Mologino, Tver Oblast, a village in Tver Oblast, Russia
Mologino, Rybinsky District, Yaroslavl Oblast, a village in Rybinsky District of Yaroslavl Oblast, Russia
Mologino, Yaroslavsky District, Yaroslavl Oblast, a village in Yaroslavsky District of Yaroslavl Oblast, Russia